The Food and Agriculture Act of 1965 (Pub. L. 89-321, 79 Stat. 1187), the first multiyear farm legislation, provided for four year commodity programs for wheat, feed grains, and upland cotton. It was extended for one more year through 1970 (P.L. 90 559). It authorized a Class I milk base plan for the 75 federal milk marketing orders, as well as a long term diversion of cropland under a Cropland Adjustment Program.  It also continued payment and diversion programs for feed grains and cotton, and marketing certificate and diversion programs for wheat.

References 

 

United States federal agriculture legislation
1965 in law
1965 in the United States
89th United States Congress